Weiden Römergrab is a Cologne Stadtbahn station served by line 1 and located on Aachener Straße in the district of Köln-Weiden.

The station was renamed on December, 15th 2019 from Weiden Schulstraße to Weiden Römergrab.

See also 
 List of Cologne KVB stations

References

External links 
 station info page 
 

Cologne-Bonn Stadtbahn stations
Cologne KVB stations
Lindenthal, Cologne